Radio BA is a Bosnian commercial radio station, broadcasting from Sarajevo.

Radio BA was founded during 2009 and the station focuses on contemporary pop music, entertainment and local news.
The program is currently broadcast at one frequency (Sarajevo ), estimated number of potential listeners is around 443,685.

Frequencies

 Sarajevo

References

External links 
 Official website
 Communications Regulatory Agency of Bosnia and Herzegovina
 Radio BA in Facebook

See also 
List of radio stations in Bosnia and Herzegovina

Sarajevo
Radio stations established in 2009
Mass media in Sarajevo